Warm Nights on a Slow Moving Train is a 1988 Australian film directed by Bob Ellis and starring Wendy Hughes, Colin Friels, and Norman Kaye. Nominated at the AFI Awards in the Best Achievement in Cinematography (Yuri Sokol) category.

Premise 
Working as a prostitute on the weekend train to Sydney Jenny (Wendy Hughes) meets The Man (Colin Friels), who seduces her so that she will murder for him.

Cast 
 Wendy Hughes as Jenny Nicholson aka. The Girl
 Colin Friels as The Man
 Norman Kaye as Salesman
 John Clayton as Football coach
 Rod Zuanic as Young soldier
 Lewis Fitz-Gerald as Brian
 Peter Whitford as Steward

Production 
Bob Ellis said the idea for the film came to Denny Lawrence as he and Ellis were travelling on a train and they wrote the script together. Ellis said "the idea was that each client would be some part of the Australian male".

Ellis said funding of the film was dependent on casting Wendy Hughes, who he always thought was miscast, although he says her performance was excellent and she was a joy to work with.

Release 
The film was greatly shortened by producer Ross Dimsey and Ellis described the making of the movie as one of the worst experiences of his life. Ellis:
It was one of the best scripts I've ever written. We made the grave error of agreeing to let Dimsey produce it and then the worse error of moving the whole thing to Melbourne. So I was away from home. And there was this whole 10 BA set-up with shifty lawyers who, I didn't know, had kind of agreed to fire me at a certain point if I fulfilled certain expectations. Which I didn't. But I got fired quite late in the day and then 64 laughs, by my count, were removed. It wasn't meant to be funny, but it was a viable experience. I had Yuri Sokol shooting it. He's a wonderful cameraman but he's an awful bastard and he would sometimes light with candles... It was a nasty experience, as nasty as I've experienced. So it really ditched me as a director. Because it would have been - had my cut, which fortunately several people like Al Finney and Bob Weiss saw and said it would have been the best Australian film - had my cut survived and been shown (but it was burnt with our house), I would have then had a directing career not unlike that of, say, Simon Wincer where I would have had some credibility overseas and so on.

See also 
 Cinema of Australia

References

External links
 Warm Nights on a Slow Moving Train at BFI
 Warm Nights on a Slow Moving Train at Oz Movies
 

1988 films
Australian drama films
Rail transport films
1988 drama films
1980s English-language films